Sinezona pacifica is a species of minute sea snail, a marine gastropod mollusk or micromollusk in the family Scissurellidae, the little slit shells.

Description
The height of the shell reaches 1 mm.  The width of the shell is greater than the height, with a low spire.  The shells are white.

Distribution
This marine species occurs off New Zealand, Lord Howe Island, Norfolk Island and Macquarie Island; New South Wales and Southwest Western Australia.

References

 Bandel (1998). Mitt. Geol.-Pal. Inst. Univ. Hamburg 81 : 1–119
 Jansen, P. (1999). The Australian Scissurellidae. La Conchiglia. 31 (291)
 Geiger D.L. (2012) Monograph of the little slit shells. Volume 1. Introduction, Scissurellidae. pp. 1–728. Volume 2. Anatomidae, Larocheidae, Depressizonidae, Sutilizonidae, Temnocinclidae. pp. 729–1291. Santa Barbara Museum of Natural History Monographs Number 7

External links
 

Scissurellidae
Gastropods described in 1915